The Miseducation of Cameron Post is a 2018 coming-of-age drama film directed by Desiree Akhavan and written by Akhavan and Cecilia Frugiuele, based on the 2012 novel by Emily M. Danforth. It stars Chloë Grace Moretz, John Gallagher Jr., Sasha Lane, Forrest Goodluck, Marin Ireland, Owen Campbell, Kerry Butler, Quinn Shephard, Emily Skeggs, Melanie Ehrlich, and Jennifer Ehle. Moretz plays a teenager sent to a gay conversion therapy centre. The film had its world premiere at the Sundance Film Festival on January 22, 2018. It was released in the United States on August 3, 2018, by FilmRise, and United Kingdom on September 7, 2018, by Vertigo Releasing. It received positive reviews and has grossed $2 million globally.

Plot
In 1993, teenager Cameron Post is secretly involved in a romantic same-sex relationship with her girlfriend, Coley Taylor. On homecoming night, Cameron's boyfriend walks in on them having sex in Coley's car, ultimately outing them both. Cameron's aunt Ruth, a devout Christian, sends Cameron to God's Promise, a gay conversion therapy center for teenagers. It is run by the strict Dr. Lydia Marsh and her brother Reverend Rick who claims that his sister's methods cured him of his own homosexuality after two members of his church "rescued" him from a gay bar. Cameron's roommate Erin represses her homosexuality and earnestly believes in the camp's program.

Cameron befriends two of her fellow "disciples," Jane Fonda, who was raised in a hippie commune, and Adam Red Eagle, a Lakota two-spirit whose father has converted to Christianity. The three teenagers bond over their mutual rebelliousness and skepticism of the camp's purpose.

During a group session, Cameron admits that she thinks Coley is "perfect" and is told by Dr. Marsh that her homosexuality stems from a misplaced urge to be like Coley. She covertly phones Coley during a visit to a restaurant and apologizes for how things turned out. Coley says she sent Cameron a letter, but the call is interrupted. After disrupting a kitchen chore session, Cameron has her mail privileges unexpectedly granted by Dr. Marsh. She reads Coley's letter only to find that Coley blames her for "seducing" her into sin. Jane reads the letter with Cameron and then destroys it, calling Coley weak-willed and treacherous. Crying, Cameron calls her aunt and asks to be brought home. Ruth turns her down.

Cameron tries to adapt better to life at God's Promise, exercising with Erin to Christian work-out tapes. One night while Cameron is having a sexual dream, Erin wakes her up and then both girls kiss. Erin puts her hand in Cameron's sheets and pants to make love to her. Cameron has an orgasm but Erin regrets it and asks Cameron not to tell anyone because she wants to change.

Another disciple, Mark, who has been expecting to return home shortly, is informed by letter that he must remain at the camp because his father still considers him effeminate. In a group session, Mark breaks down and begins behaving erratically until he is forcibly restrained by Dr. Marsh. That night, Cameron finds large quantities of blood in one of the bathrooms.

The next morning, Dr. Marsh and Reverend Rick call a meeting, announcing that Mark was badly injured during the night and is stable in a hospital, but do not explain what happened. Two of the "disciples" disrupt the meeting and a series of one-to-one meetings is held instead. During their one-to-one, Rick explains to Cameron that Mark mutilated his own genitals and nearly died before Adam found him. Cameron asks why the staff wasn't monitoring Mark more closely and asks Rick if he and Dr. Marsh have any idea what they are doing. Rick cannot answer her questions and bursts into tears. A government inquiry is launched into Mark's self-mutilation, but the investigator is unwilling to accept Cameron's argument that God's Promise is inherently emotionally abusive.

Disillusioned, Cameron, Jane and Adam decide to run away from the camp under the pretense of an early morning hike. They walk to a nearby road and hitchhike away from the camp.

Cast

Production
In November 2016, it was announced Chloë Grace Moretz, Sasha Lane, John Gallagher Jr., Forrest Goodluck and Jennifer Ehle had all been cast in the film, with Desiree Akhavan directing the film, from a screenplay co-written with Cecilia Frugiuele.

Michael B. Clark, Alex Turtletaub, Jonathan Montepare and Frugiuele served as producers, with Akhavan and Olivier Kaempfer as executive producers, under their Beachside and Parkville Pictures banners.

Filming
Principal photography began in November 2016 in New York State.

Release
The film had its world premiere at the Sundance Film Festival on January 22, 2018, where it won the Grand Jury Prize for US Drama, the festival's highest honor. Shortly after, FilmRise and Vertigo Releasing acquired US and UK distribution rights to the film, respectively. The film went onto screen at the Tribeca Film Festival on April 22, 2018.

It was originally scheduled to be released in the United States on August 10, 2018, at the Kaleidoscope Film Festival in Arkansas, however it was pushed forward by a week to August 3, 2018. It was scheduled to be released in the United Kingdom on August 31, 2018, but was pushed back to September 7, 2018.

Reception
The Miseducation of Cameron Post has received positive reviews from film critics. The website's critical consensus reads, "The Miseducation of Cameron Post tells its timely coming-of-age story with wit, compassion, and an affecting overall generosity of spirit." On Metacritic, the film holds a rating of 69 out of 100, based on reviews from 36 critics, indicating "generally favorable reviews".

References

External links
 
 

2018 films
2018 drama films
2018 independent films
2018 LGBT-related films
2010s teen drama films
American independent films
American teen drama films
American teen LGBT-related films
British independent films
British teen drama films
British teen LGBT-related films
Films about conversion therapy
Films based on American novels
Films set in 1993
Films shot in New York (state)
Lesbian-related films
LGBT-related drama films
Juvenile sexuality in films
Films about anti-LGBT sentiment
LGBT-related coming-of-age films
Sundance Film Festival award winners
2010s English-language films
2010s American films
2010s British films